2-step garage, or simply 2-step, is a genre of electronic music and a subgenre of UK garage. One of the primary characteristics of the 2-step sound – the term being coined to describe "a general rubric for all kinds of jittery, irregular rhythms that don't conform to garage's traditional four-on-the-floor pulse" – is that the rhythm lacks the kick drum pattern found in many other styles of electronic music with a regular four-on-the-floor beat.

Characteristics
A typical 2-step drum pattern features syncopated kick drums that skip a beat, with shuffled rhythm or triplets applied to other elements of the percussion, resulting in a sound noticeably distinct to those present in other house or techno music. Although rhythms with two kicks to a bar may be considered less energetic than the four on the floor pattern, 2-step rhythms maintain the listener's interest with off-beat snare placements and accents in the drumlines, scattered rimshots and woodblocks,  syncopated basslines, and the percussive use of other instruments such as pads or strings.

Instrumentation usually includes keyboards, synthesizers, and drum machines. Other instruments are added to expand the musical palette, often in the form of acoustic recordings, which may be sampled. The primary synth basslines used in 2-step are similar to those in the style's progenitors such as UK garage, drum and bass, and jungle. Influences from funk and soul can also be heard. Vocals in 2-step garage are usually female, and similar in style to those prevalent in house music and contemporary R&B. Some 2-step producers also process and cut up elements of a cappella vocals and use it as an element of the track. Much like other genres derived from UK garage, MCs are often featured, particularly in a live context, with a vocal style reminiscent of old school jungle.

Influences from hip hop and drum and bass, particularly the techstep subgenre have also been noted by critics. The fact that the scene had a significantly different atmosphere to those that surrounded precursors with less aggression at live events was also noted by some critics.

History

Early years

2-step rose to prominence as a genre on jungle and garage-based pirate radio stations in London as an evolution of, and perhaps reaction to developments in contemporary genres such as speed garage, with early 2-step shows often airing at "mellow moments in the weekend" such as Saturday morning or Sunday afternoon. DJs would mix UK garage productions with those of American house and US garage producers such as Masters at Work and Todd Edwards, pitching up the imports to around 130bpm to aid beatmatching. DJs favoured the instrumental (or 'dub') versions of these tracks, because it was possible to play these versions faster without the vocal element of the track sounding odd. The sound of these pitched-up, imported records was quickly imitated by UK producers in their own music.

Growing popularity
As the popularity of the sound spread, nights dedicated to it began to crop up, especially in London and Southampton. Label owner and dubstep musician Steve Goodman commented on the Hyperdub website on the debut of Forward>>, a highly influential nightclub in 2-step and later derivatives of the "UK hardcore continuum" – a phrase coined by Goodman to sum up the constant evolution in the hardcore/jungle/garage sound, and later adopted by other writers documenting the scene, such as Martin Clark. Arguably one of the earliest examples of a 2-step track is the 1997 Kelly G remix of "Never Gonna Let You Go" by Tina Moore, which was a No. 7 hit on the UK Singles Chart. Other notable 2-step hits released in 1997 include "Destiny" by Dem 2 and "The Theme" by the Dreem Teem.

1999–2001: Mainstream success
Between 1999 and 2001, 2-step reached the peak of the genre's commercial success. Some critics noted that party organizers favoured 2-step events over nights themed around jungle, drum and bass or other musical precursors because the 2-step nights invited a larger female attendance, and a less aggressive crowd. Much like drum and bass before it, 2-step started to garner crossover appeal, with a collaboration between 2-step producers Artful Dodger and R&B vocalist Craig David reaching #2 in the UK Singles Chart in late 1999 with the song "Re-Rewind". Group DJ Pied Piper and the Masters of Ceremonies had a number-one hit with "Do You Really Like It? in June 2001.

2001–present: Decline
After 2001, 2-step as a genre experienced a decline in popularity, but the more experimental releases in the genre from artists such as Horsepower Productions, Zed Bias, Wookie and Steve Gurley stripped away much of the R&B influence of the genre. This style took on a number of names including "dark 2-step", "new dark swing", and the more general term, "dark garage". This style became a major influence on later styles of UK garage influenced music, such as grime, as well as becoming a direct precursor to dubstep, which took the emphasis on bass and the instrumental nature of later 2-step compositions to their logical conclusion. In 2006, this latter, more experimental style experienced a resurgence in interest, due to the release of the Roots of Dubstep compilation on Tempa, and producers wishing to revisit the roots of the dubstep sound.

Canadian singer The Weeknd's 2016 song "Rockin'" makes use of 2-step sounds.

See also
List of UK garage artists
List of UK garage songs

References

UK garage genres
20th-century music genres
English styles of music